Sindh is a province in Pakistan. 

The province includes a number of important historical sites. The Indus Valley civilization (IVC) was a Bronze Age civilization  (mature period 2600–1900 BCE) which was centred mostly in the Sindh.Sindh has numerous tourist sites with the most prominent being the ruins of Mohenjo-daro near the city of Larkana. Islamic architecture is quite prominent as well as colonial and post-partition sites. Additionally natural sites, like Manchar Lake have increasingly been a source of sustainable tourism in the province.

Significant sites 

Sindh has numerous tourist sites with the most prominent being the ruins of Mohenjo-daro near the city of Larkana. Islamic architecture is quite prominent in the province with the Shahjahan Mosque in Thatta built by the Mughal emperor Shahjahan and numerous mausoleums dot the province including the very old Shahbaz Qalander mausoleum dedicated to the Iranian-born Sufi and the beautiful mausoleum of Muhammad Ali Jinnah known as the Mazar-e-Quaid in Karachi.

Mohatta Palace, a museum in Karachi built in 1927 by Shivratan Chandraratan Mohatta a Hindu Marwari businessman. At Partition of Sub-continent in 1947, Mohatta Palace was acquired by the newly established Government of Pakistan to house its Ministry of Foreign Affairs. Frere Hall is one of the finest architecture of the British Colonial Era which is one of the most significant tourists spot in Karachi. The Hall was built by Sir Henry Bartle Frere and was initiated in 1863 and the construction process was accomplished in 2 years in 1865. Faiz Mahal is also a palace situated in Khairpur, Sindh. It was built in 1798 by Mir Sohrab Khan who belongs to Talpur Family. It is an example of architectural excellence, a world apart from today's stone-washed structures, is undeniable.

Eco-tourism 
It is claimed to be one of the biggest freshwater lakes in Pakistan and the only lake that is home to fishermen living on wooden boathouses for hundreds of years. The lake spreads over an area of 2 and gets its water from the Kirthar Hills torrents and Indus River. The lake receives 385,000 visitors a year.

Other places of interest

Historical Sites 
Chaukhandi tombs
Empress Market
Faiz Mahal
Frere Hall
Jehangir Kothari Parade
Kot Diji Fort
Mazar-e-Quaid
Mohenjo-daro
Makli Necropolis
Mohatta Palace
Qasim Fort
Ranikot Fort
Umerkot Fort

Hilly Areas 
Kirthar Mountains
Karoonjhar Mountains
Gorakh Hill

Lakes 
Manchar Lake
Keenjhar Lake
Haleji Lake
Drigh Lake

Government support

Development corporation

See also 
 Tourism in Pakistan
 Tourism in Punjab, Pakistan
 Tourism in Balochistan
 Tourism in Khyber Pakhtunkhwa
 Tourism in Azad Kashmir
 Tourism in Gilgit-Baltistan
 Tourism in Karachi

References

External links 

 Sindh Tourism Development Corporation (STDC)
 Tourists and Culture Department Sindh
 Tourism in Sindh, PTDC